Petrella may refer to:

 Monte Petrella, a peak in the Aurunci Mountains in central Italy
 Petrella Liri, a frazione (parish) in the Province of L'Aquila in Italy
 Petrella Salto, a comune (municipality) in the Province of Rieti in Italy
 Petrella Tifernina, a comune (municipality) in the Province of Campobasso in Italy
 Petrella v. Metro-Goldwyn-Mayer, Inc., a 2014 United States Supreme Court copyright case about the Raging Bull movie
 SS Petrella, sunk 1944

See also 
 Petrella (surname)